The Mbeya (also Mbé, Mbei) is a river of Gabon and Equatorial Guinea. It is a tributary of the Komo River. The Gabonese power and water utility SEEG, a subsidiary of Veolia, operates two hydroelectric dams on the river at Kinguélé (58 MW) and Tchimbélé (69 MW).

References

Rivers of Equatorial Guinea
Rivers of Gabon
International rivers of Africa